Coming Through is a 1925 American silent drama film directed by A. Edward Sutherland starring Thomas Meighan and Lila Lee. The film was Sutherland's directorial debut.

Plot
As described in a review in a film magazine, Tom Blackford (Meighan) is counting on a promised promotion that will allow him to marry Alice (Lee), the daughter of his employer John Rand (Miltern). When the appointment goes to Rand's Nephew, Tom marries Alice anyway, to the distress of her father, and cunningly turns against him his incautious remark that the road to advancement runs through relationships. He offers Tom the position of superintendent of one of the company's mines. Rand then writes to Joe Lawler (Beery), who had expected to receive that appointment, that the company will make him superintendent if Blackford quits, intimating that he does not care what means are taken to induce this. Alice goes with her husband, though she declares that she does not love him, and they set up a platonic honeymoon. Lawler, working with Shackleton (Campeau), the keeper of the local speakeasy, stirs up trouble at the mine, finally causing a strike. Tom abolishes the dive after a drunken engineer nearly kills some of the mine workers. He turns the tables against Lawler by showing that he cheated the workers with crooked scales. In a fight on the coal tipple, Lawler is thrown from the structure when the iron bar he is swinging at Tom is caught in the machinery. With the strike over, Tom returns home to find that Alice is ready to admit her love.

Cast

Preservation
With no prints of Coming Through located in any film archives, it is a lost film.

References

External links

American silent feature films
Films directed by A. Edward Sutherland
1925 drama films
Silent American drama films
Lost American films
American black-and-white films
1925 directorial debut films
1925 lost films
Lost drama films
1920s American films
1920s English-language films